Koliwad is a village in the Hubli taluk of Dharwad district in the state of Karnataka, India. Koliwad is the birthplace of Kumaravyasa.

Demographics
As of the 2011 Census of India there were 1,097 households in Koliwad and a total population of 5,220 consisting of 2,634 males and 2,586 females. There were 603 children ages 0-6.

See also
Annigeri
Gadag-Betageri
Karnataka
Koli people

References

Villages in Dharwad district